Pallakilo Pellikoothuru is a 2004 Indian Telugu-language romantic drama film directed by Suchitra Chandrabose. Its stars Gowtham and Rathi. The film introduces Brahmanandam's son Gowtham and Bangalore-based Rathi's Telugu debut. K. Raghavendra Rao scripted the film in addition to supervising the direction.

Plot 

The film follows Rani (Rathi), a woman who is due to marry an NRI. She attends a school called Pallaki College to help her get accustomed to the American way of life. The school is run by Gowtam (Gowtam)'s family. Whether Gowtam expresses his love to Rani or lets Rani marry an NRI forms the rest of the plot.

Cast 

 Gowtam as Gowtam
 Rathi as Rani
 Vaibhav
 Giri Babu
 Tanikella Bharani
 Brahmanandam
 Dharmavarapu Subramanyam
 M. S. Narayana
 Sunil
 Venu Madhav
 Balayya as Rani's grandfather
 Kondavalasa Lakshmana Rao
 Ravi Babu as Dubai Babu
 Mustafa
 Rama Prabha
 Telangana Shakuntala as Pallaki College principal
 Sudha as a fashion designer
 Hema
 Sirisha
Shakeela
Sunayana
Aswini Sharma
Sathipandu

Production 
Suchitra Chandrabose conceived the story while on the sets of Paradesi (1998).

Soundtrack 
Songs composed by M. M. Keeravani. Lyrics by Chandrabose.

"Naa Peru Cheppukondi"
"Nuvvu Pre Nenu Ma"
"Vanaku Tadisina Vallu"
"Muddu Leni Prema"
"Chempaku Chukkalu Petti"
"Cheeraloni Goppatanam"

Reception 
A critic from Sify opined that "Pallakilo Pellikoothuru is disappointing from the word go". On the contrary, Gudipoodi Srihari of The Hindu wrote that "Though the film is set in the same formula mode of Raghavendra Rao, the treatment of the subject is pleasant experience with all those pleasantries, fun and frolic and bonhomie of a marriage". Jeevi of Idlebrain.com wrote that "First half of the film is mediocre. Second half is a let down. Plus points of the film are music, heroine and songs picturization. Negative points are old-fashioned filmmaking, predictable screenplay, non-contemporary treatment". Mithun Verma of Full Hyderabad wrote that "There is that Raghavender Rao presence in the style of moviemaking here. And some really good humor".

References